Julio César Cortez Ávalos (born February 10, 1981) is a Bolivian footballer who currently plays for Universitario de Beni.

References

External links
 
 

1981 births
Living people
Sportspeople from Santa Cruz de la Sierra
Bolivian footballers
Association football midfielders
Club Blooming players
La Paz F.C. players
CA Bizertin players
The Strongest players
Municipal Real Mamoré players
Universitario de Sucre footballers
Bolivian expatriate footballers
Expatriate footballers in Tunisia
Expatriate footballers in Azerbaijan